The Road Agent is a 1926 American silent Western film directed by J.P. McGowan and starring Al Hoxie, Ione Reed and Lew Meehan.

Cast
 Al Hoxie as Roger Worth / The Kansas Kid
 Ione Reed as Mary Ryan
 Lew Meehan as Attorney Frank Craven
 Leon De La Mothe as Henchman Hammer Hawkins
 Florence Lee as Mrs. Worth - the Mother
 Frank Ellis as The Sheriff
 Ted Adams as The Doctor
 Roy Bucko as Henchman 
 Tex Phelps as Saloon Brawler
 Archie Ricks as Short Henchman

References

Bibliography
 Pitts, Michael R. Western Movies: A Guide to 5,105 Feature Films. McFarland, 2012.
 McGowan, John J. J.P. McGowan: Biography of a Hollywood Pioneer. McFarland, 2005.

External links
 

1926 films
1926 Western (genre) films
American black-and-white films
Films directed by J. P. McGowan
Rayart Pictures films
Silent American Western (genre) films
Revisionist Western (genre) films
1920s English-language films
1920s American films